Cimitero degli Inglesi is the Italian name of:
the English Cemetery, Florence and
the English Cemetery, Naples and
the Old English Cemetery, Livorno
The Protestant Cemetery, Rome is occasionally also known by this name